Monstera luteynii is a species of flowering plant in the genus Monstera of the arum family, Araceae.

Distribution 
Its native range is Costa Rica.

References 

luteynii